Scopula lactarioides is a moth of the family Geometridae. It is found in Iran.

References

Moths described in 1941
lactarioides
Moths of the Middle East